Robinson Crusoe is a 1719 book by Daniel Defoe.

Robinson Crusoe may also refer to:

Adaptations of the novel

Films
 Robinson Crusoe (1902 film), a French silent film by Georges Méliès
 Robinson Crusoe (1916 film), an American silent film by George F. Marion
 Robinson Crusoe (1924 film), an American film by Bryan Foy
 Robinson Crusoe (1927 film), a British silent film by M.A. Wetherell
 Robinson Crusoe (1947 film), a Soviet film by Aleksandr Andriyevsky
 Robinson Crusoe (1954 film), a Mexican film by Luis Buñuel, made in English and Spanish
 Robinson Crusoe (1970 film), a Mexican film by René Cardona Jr.
 Robinson Crusoe (1974 film), an Italian/Romanian animated film by Francesco Maurizio Guido
 Robinson Crusoe (1997 film), a British/American film by Rod Hardy and George T. Miller
 Robinson Crusoe (2016 film), a Belgian/French animated film by Vincent Kesteloot and Ben Stassen, released as The Wild Life in North America

Television
The Adventures of Robinson Crusoe, a 1964 French-German children's television drama series
 Robinson Crusoe (1972 film), an animated television film, aired as part of the CBS anthology series Famous Classic Tales
 "Robinson Crusoe", an 1973 episode of the Rankin/Bass animated anthology series Festival of Family Classics
 "Robinson Crusoe", a 1974 installment of the BBC anthology series Play of the Month
 Robinson Crusoe (2008 film), a 2008 Greek television film by Giorgos Mesalas

Operetta
Robinson Crusoé (1867), an operetta by Jacques Offenbach

Places
Robinson Crusoe Island, Chile
Robinson Crusoe Island (Fiji)

Other uses
Robinson Crusoe economy, a framework to study trade in economics
Robinson Crusoes of Warsaw, or Robinsons, individuals who hid in ruins of Warsaw after the World War II Warsaw Uprising

See also
Crusoe (disambiguation)
Robinsonade, a genre inspired by Robinson Crusoe
Robinzon Kruzo, a 1947 Soviet 3D film by Aleksandr Andriyevsky
 Man Friday, a 1975 British/American film by Jack Gold
 Adventures of Robinson Crusoe, a Sailor from York, a 1982 Soviet animated film by Stanislav Látal